The following is a list of WIG or 'wing-in-ground'-effect craft, also referred to as water-skimming wingships or, in Russia, 'ekranoplans'.

Australia
 Sea Eagle (WIG craft) - six-seater wing-in-ground effect craft

China
 DXF100 (Tianyi-1) - 15 seater wing-in-ground effect craft, designed by China Academy of Science & Technology Development. In 2000, the model is for commercial sale in China. The first buyer of Tianyi-1 used the vehicle to carry tourists around Lake Tai.
 Xiangzhou 1 -  7 passenger capacity wing-in-ground effect craft, 12.7 meters long, 11 meters wide and 3.9 meters tall with a maximum takeoff weight of 2.5 tons.

Europe

France 
Pennec Navion: Designed and built by Serge Pennec at Geovas, near Brest in Brittany

Germany 
 Seafalcon http://www.seafalcon.net/
 TAF http://www.botec.org/wordpress/wir-uber-uns/?lang=en Germany, but GEV's are in Greece - Kavala at the Aegean Sea
 TAF VIII-1  two-seater Tandem Airfoil Flairboat Typ Jörg 1, built in 1987. This WIG craft has experienced about 100.000 km and is still in use in private property. 
 TAF VIII-2, four-seater Tandem Airfoil Flairboat Typ Jörg II, built in 1983. Following the F&E and test period, Dipl. Ing. Günther Jörg was awarded with the "Phillip Morris Scientific Award" for the Transportation System for the future. 
 Another TAF VIII-2, built in 1994 was given to a Japanese private citizen. 
 TAF VIII-3, eight-seater Tandem Airfoil Flairboat Typ Jörg III, built in 1990. 
 TAF VIII-4  twelve-seater TAF, Typ Jörg IV built in 1986 for coastal protection reasons.

Iran
 HESA Bavar 2, a two-seater (allegedly) semi-stealth military GEV that entered active duty in 2010.

Korea 
 ARON Flying Ship
 Sungwoo Engineering Wing in the Ground Effect Ship
 Wing Ship Technology Corp WSH-500
 Wing Ship Technology Corp WSH-1500

Russia

Civil WIG
 Ivolga EK-12
 Aquaglide-2

Military WIG
 Beriev Be-1 - Experimental aircraft used in development of VVA-14
 Bartini Beriev VVA-14 - Amphibious anti-submarine aircraft, only prototypes were produced
 KM "Kaspian Monster" - largest GEV in the world
 Lun-class ekranoplan - Lun Class Ekranoplan
 A-90 Orlyonok - Orlyonok Ekranoplan
 Beriev Be-2500 - Beriev Be- 2500 (Future Plane)
 Aqualet - New 2011 Russian development of Ground Effect Vehicle
 Chaika A-050

Singapore
 AF8-001 (Air Fish) - WidgetWorks is developing the AirFish 8, previously known as Lippisch WIG, Flightship, or FS8.  The AirFish uses an air-cushion to raise the vehicle and travels at speeds up to 80 knots. Currently still in prototype with one built and tested beginning in 2001. Assets of the prior owner were liquidated at auction.

United States
 Boeing Pelican
 Collins X-112
  AirFish 3 and 8 respective 3 and 8 seaters by www.wigetworks.com
 Regent Seaglider

See also
 Ground effect vehicle
 Ground effect train

References

External links
 Ekranoplan Moscow Top News

 
Ground effect vehicles